Black Sun: Aryan Cults, Esoteric Nazism and the Politics of Identity is a book by the historian Nicholas Goodrick-Clarke, in which the author examines post-war Nazi occultism and similar phenomena.

It was published by New York University Press in 2002 and reissued in paperback.

Summary
The book uses the Nazi occultism covered in Goodrick-Clarke's 1985 book The Occult Roots of Nazism to trace similar phenomena in the post-war West. According to the author, movements with such interests are particularly prevalent in the English-speaking world. Because the occultism found in the SS can be traced to Ariosophy, which emerged from the völkisch movement, Goodrick-Clarke coins the term "neo-völkisch" for the groups he covers in the book. These groups are defined by "concerns with white identity and ethnicity" and in many cases take interest in "esoteric themes of Aryan origins, secred knowledge and occult heritage". Subjects surveyed include American and British neo-Nazism, the writings of Julius Evola and Francis Parker Yockey, Savitri Devi's and Miguel Serrano's Esoteric Nazism, belief in Nazi UFOs, neo-Nazi Satanism, Christian Identity, the World Church of the Creator and Nordic Racial Paganism.

Reception
Publishers Weekly called the book a "comprehensive inquiry" which "adds to our knowledge of the broad, frightening tentacles of Nazi ideology".

References

Sources

External links
 Black Sun at Google Books.
 Joseph P. Szimhart Nicholas Goodrick-Clarke. Black Sun: Aryan Cults, Esoteric Nazism and the Politics of Identity.  New York: New York University Press, 2002, 371 pages. $29.95. . // Cultic Studies Review. 2002. Vol. 1. №. 3. 
 Article by Goodrick-Clarke
 Black Sun: Aryan Cults, Esoteric Nazism and the Politics of Identity By Nicholas Goodrick-Clarke New York University Press, 2002 371 Pages, US$24.97  by John J. Reily
 Reviewed by the Southern Poverty Law Center

2001 non-fiction books
Books by Nicholas Goodrick-Clarke
English-language books
Occultism in Nazism
Neo-Nazism in popular culture
New York University Press books
Occult books
Books about the far right